Anariye Pirapur (अनरिये पीरापुर) is a mool grama (origin village) of one of the clans of Maithil Brahmins in Sandilya gotra. One clan of Maithil Brahmins were originated from this village. Harinatha is the first person of the village recorded in the written history. His son was Acyuta. Acyuta's daughter was married with Maharaja Rudranarayan. Acyuta was also the son-in-law of Sankara of Jalaya mool. Anariye is also sometimes written as Allāri and Anāri. Anariye mool was divided into three mool grama (मूल ग्राम). They were Anariye Naguniya, Anariye Nehra and Anariye Pirapur.

References 

Maithil Brahmin
Mithila
Clans
Gotras
Hindu communities